The 2018 Gander Outdoors 400 is a Monster Energy NASCAR Cup Series race held on July 29, 2018, at Pocono Raceway in Long Pond, Pennsylvania. Contested over 164 laps—extended from 160 laps due to an overtime finish, on the  superspeedway, it was the 21st race of the 2018 Monster Energy NASCAR Cup Series season.

Report

Background

Pocono Raceway is a superspeedway located in the Pocono Mountains of Pennsylvania at Long Pond. It is the site of two annual NASCAR Sprint Cup Series races held in early June and late July/early August, one NASCAR Xfinity Series event in early June, one NASCAR Camping World Truck Series event in late July/early August, and two ARCA Racing Series races in early June and late July/early August. From 1971 to 1989, and again since 2013, the track has also hosted an Indy Car race, currently sanctioned by the IndyCar Series and run in August.

Pocono is one of a very few NASCAR tracks not owned by either Speedway Motorsports, Inc. or International Speedway Corporation, the dominant track owners in NASCAR. It is run by the Igdalsky siblings Brandon and Nicholas, both of whom are third-generation members of the family-owned Mattco Inc, started by Joseph II and Rose Mattioli. Mattco also owns South Boston Speedway in South Boston, Virginia.

Outside of the NASCAR races, Pocono is used throughout the year by Sports Car Club of America (SCCA) and motorcycle clubs as well as racing schools. The triangular oval also has three separate infield sections of racetrack – North Course, East Course and South Course. Each of these infield sections use a separate portion of the tri-oval to complete the track.  During regular non-race weekends, multiple clubs can use the track by running on different infield sections.  Also some of the infield sections can be run in either direction, or multiple infield sections can be put together – such as running the North Course and the South Course and using the tri-oval to connect the two.

Entry list

Practice

First practice

Final practice

Qualifying

Daniel Suárez scored the pole for the race with a time of 50.851 and a speed of  after Kevin Harvick and Kyle Busch were both disqualified after failing post-qualifying inspection.

Qualifying results

Kevin Harvick and Kyle Busch will start from the rear after both cars failed post-qualifying inspection, leaving Daniel Suárez as the polesitter. Kyle Larson, Joey Logano, William Byron, Austin Dillon, Jimmie Johnson, Paul Menard, Ryan Blaney, Aric Almirola, Clint Bowyer, Darrell Wallace Jr. and Kasey Kahne also failed post-qualifying inspection. All 13 cars that failed the post-qualifying inspection will start at the rear and they lined up based on owner points.
Gray Gaulding practiced and qualified the No. 15 for Ross Chastain who was in Iowa for the Xfinity Series race. Chastain will start at the rear due to Driver Change.

Race

Stage Results

Stage 1
Laps: 50

Stage 2
Laps: 50

Final Stage Results

Stage 3
Laps: 60

Race statistics
 Lead changes: 10 among different drivers
 Cautions/Laps: 7 for 29
 Red flags: 1 for 10 minutes and 10 seconds
 Time of race: 3 hours, 5 minutes and 43 seconds
 Average speed:

Media

Television
NBC Sports covered the race on the television side. Rick Allen, Jeff Burton, Steve Letarte and two-time Pocono winner Dale Earnhardt Jr. had the call in the booth for the race. Dave Burns, Marty Snider and Kelli Stavast reported from pit lane during the race.

Radio
Motor Racing Network had the radio call for the race, which was  simulcast on Sirius XM NASCAR Radio.

Standings after the race

Drivers' Championship standings

Manufacturers' Championship standings

Note: Only the first 16 positions are included for the driver standings.
. – Driver has clinched a position in the Monster Energy NASCAR Cup Series playoffs.

References

2018 Gander Outdoors 400
2018 Monster Energy NASCAR Cup Series
2018 in sports in Pennsylvania
July 2018 sports events in the United States